Thout, also known as Thoth (Thōth) and Tut, is the first month of the ancient Egyptian and Coptic calendars. It lies between 11 September and 10 October of the Gregorian calendar. The month of Thout is also the first month of the Season of Akhet (Inundation) in Ancient Egypt, when the Nile floods historically covered the land of Egypt; it has not done so since the construction of the High Dam at Aswan.

Name
The name of the month comes from Thoth, the Ancient Egyptian God of Wisdom and Science, inventor of writing, patron of scribes, and "he who designates the seasons, months, and years." Thoth presided over the "House of Life," which were composed and copied all texts necessary for the maintenance and replenishment of life.

Coptic Synaxarium of the month of Thout

See also
 Egyptian, Coptic, and Islamic calendars

References

Citations

Bibliography
  Synaxarium of the month of Tout

Months of the Coptic calendar
Egyptian calendar